The 44th Annual Grammy Awards were held on February 27, 2002 at the Staples Center in Los Angeles, California. The main recipient was Alicia Keys, winning five Grammys, including Best New Artist and Song of the Year for "Fallin'". U2 won four awards including Record of the Year and Best Rock Album, while opening the show with a performance of "Walk On".

Performers

Presenters
 Matthew Perry and Britney Spears - Best Pop Performance by a Duo or Group with Vocals
 Natalie Cole, Dave Koz and P. Diddy - Best Female Pop Vocal Performance
 Craig David, Steve Vai and Nelly Furtado - Best Rap Album
 Backstreet Boys and Sarah Elizabeth Hughes - Best Pop Collaboration with Vocals
 Ja Rule, Pamela Anderson and Jamie Foxx - Best R&B Album
 Don Henley and Trisha Yearwood - Best Rock Song
 Jamie O'Neal, Rob Thomas and Kid Rock - Best Rock Performance by a Duo or Group with Vocals
 Dixie Chicks and Sheryl Crow - Best Country Collaboration with Vocals
 Kevin James and Ray Romano - Best New Artist
 Elvis Costello, Diana Krall and Gwen Stefani - Song of the Year
 Bonnie Raitt, Celine Dion and Stevie Wonder - Record of the Year
 Gloria Estefan, Matthew McConaughey and Janet Jackson - Album of the Year

Winners and Nominees

General
Record of the Year
 "Walk On" – U2
 Brian Eno & Daniel Lanois, producers; Steve Lillywhite & Richard Rainey, engineer/mixers
 "Video" – India.Arie
 India.Arie & Carlos "Six July" Broady, producers; Kevin Haywood & Mike Shipley, engineer/mixers
 "Fallin'" – Alicia Keys
 Alicia Keys, producer; Kerry "Krucial" Brothers & Russ Elevado, engineer/mixers
 "Ms. Jackson" – OutKast
 Earthtone III, producer; John Frye & Neal H. Pogue, engineer/mixers
 "Drops of Jupiter" – Train
 Brendan O'Brien, producer; Nick DiDia, Brendan O'Brien & Ryan Williams, engineer/mixers

Album of the Year
 O Brother, Where Art Thou? – Soundtrack – Various Artists[A]
 T Bone Burnett, producer; Mike Piersante & Peter Kurland, engineers/mixers; Gavin Lurssen, mastering engineer Acoustic Soul – India.Arie
 India.Arie, Mark Batson, Carlos "Six July" Broady, Blue Miller & Bob Power, producers; Mark Batson, Carlos "Six July" Broady, Kevin Haywood, Avery Johnson, George Karas, Jim Lightman, Blue Miller, Mark Niemiec, Bob Power, Mike Shipley, Alvin Speights, Mike Tocci & Dave Way, engineer/mixers
 Love and Theft – Bob Dylan
 Jack Frost, producer; Chris Shaw, engineer/mixer
 Stankonia – OutKast
 Earthtone III, Organized Noize & Antonio "LA" Reid, producers; Jarvis Blackshear, Leslie Brathwaite, Josh Butler, Ralph Cacciurri, John Frye, Mark "DJ Exit" Goodchild, Carl Mo, Kevin Parker, Neal H. Pogue, Richard H. Segal, Kenneth Stallworth, Matt Still, Jason Stokes, Bernasky Wall & Derrick Williams, engineer/mixers
 All That You Can't Leave Behind – U2
 Brian Eno & Daniel Lanois, producers; Brian Eno, Steve Fitzmaurice, Julian Gallagher, Mike Hedges, Daniel Lanois, Steve Lillywhite, Tim Palmer, Richard Rainey & Richard Stannard, engineer/mixers

Song of the Year
 "Fallin'" Alicia Keys, songwriter (Alicia Keys) "Drops of Jupiter"
 Charlie Colin, Rob Hotchkiss, Patrick Monahan, Jimmy Stafford & Scott Underwood, songwriters (Train)
 "I'm Like a Bird"
 Nelly Furtado, songwriter (Nelly Furtado)
 "Stuck in a Moment You Can't Get Out Of"
 U2, songwriters (U2)
 "Video"
 India.Arie, Carlos "Six July" Broady & Shannon Sanders, songwriters (India.Arie)

Best New Artist
 Alicia Keys India.Arie
 Nelly Furtado
 David Gray
 Linkin Park

Alternative
Best Alternative Music Album
 Coldplay – Parachutes
 Tori Amos – Strange Little Girls
 Björk – Vespertine
 Fatboy Slim – Halfway Between the Gutter and the Stars
 Radiohead – Amnesiac

Blues
 Best Traditional Blues Album
 John P. Hampton, Jared Tuten (engineers) & Jimmie Vaughan (producer & artist) for Do You Get the Blues?
 Best Contemporary Blues Album
 Delbert McClinton, Gary Nicholson (producers), Richard Dodd, Don Smith (engineers) & Delbert McClinton for Nothing Personal

Children's
 Best Musical Album for Children
 Ed Mitchell (producer), Jimmy Hoyson & Ric Wilson (engineers) for Elmo & the Orchestra performed by the Sesame Street cast
 Best Spoken Word Album for Children
 Arnold Cardillo (producer), Rory Young (engineer) & Tom Chapin for Mama Don't Allow

Comedy
 From 1994 through 2003, see "Best Spoken Comedy Album" under the "Spoken" field, below.

Classical
 Best Orchestral Performance
 Helmut Burk & Karl-August Naegler (producers), Jobst Eberhardt, Stephan Flock (engineers), Pierre Boulez (conductor) & the Chicago Symphony Orchestra for Boulez Conducts Edgard Varèse (Amériques; Arcana; Déserts; Ionisation)
 Best Classical Vocal Performance
 Christopher Raeburn (producer), Jonathan Stokes (engineer), Bernhard Forck (conductor), Cecilia Bartoli & the Akademie für Alte Musik Berlin for Dreams & Fables - Gluck Italian Arias (Tremo Gra' Fubbi Miei; Die Questa Cetra In Seno, etc.)
 Best Opera Recording
 James Mallinson (producer), Simon Rhodes (engineer), Colin Davis (conductor), Michelle DeYoung, Ben Heppner, Petra Lang, Peter Mattei, Stephen Milling, Sara Mingardo, Kenneth Tarver & the London Symphony Orchestra for Berlioz: Les Troyens
 Best Choral Performance
 Martin Sauer (producer), Michael Brammann (engineer), Nikolaus Harnoncourt (conductor), Norbert Balatsch, Erwin Ortner (chorus masters), Bernarda Fink, Matthias Goerne, Dietrich Henschel, Elisabeth von Magnus, Christoph Prégardien, Dorothea Röschmann, Michael Schade, Christine Schäfer, Markus Schäfer, Oliver Widmer, the Arnold Schoenberg Chor, Wiener Sängerknaben & Concentus Musicas Wien for Bach: St. Matthew Passion
 Best Instrumental Soloist(s) Performance (with orchestra)
 Martin Fouqué (producer), Eberhard Sengpiel (engineer), Daniel Barenboim, Dale Clevenger, Larry Combs, Alex Klein, David McGill & the Chicago Symphony Orchestra for Richard Strauss Wind Concertos (Horn Concerto; Oboe Concerto, etc.)
 Best Instrumental Soloist Performance (without orchestra)
 Arne Akselberg (producer & engineer) & Truls Mørk (producer & artist) for Benjamin Britten Cello Suites (1 - 3)
 Best Small Ensemble Performance (with or without conductor)
 Helmut Mühle (producer), Philipp Nedel (engineer), Gidon Kremer (producer & artist) & Kremerata Baltica for After Mozart
 Best Chamber Music Performance
 Joanna Nickrenz (producer), Marc J. Aubort (engineer) & The Angeles String Quartet for Joseph Haydn: The Complete String Quartets
 Best Classical Contemporary Composition
 Christopher Rouse (composer), Muhai Tang (conductor), Sharon Isbin & the Gulbenkian Orchestra for Concert de Gaudí for Guitar and Orchestra
 Best Classical Album
 James Mallinson (producer), Simon Rhodes (engineer), Colin Davis (conductor), Michelle DeYoung, Ben Heppner, Petra Lang, Peter Mattei, Stephen Milling, Sara Mingardo, Kenneth Tarver & the London Symphony Orchestra & Chorus for Berlioz: Les Troyens
 Best Classical Crossover Album
 Edgar Meyer (producer), Robert Battaglia (engineer), Béla Fleck (producer & artist), Joshua Bell, Evelyn Glennie, Gary Hoffman, Edgar Meyer, Chris Thile & John Christopher Williams for Perpetual Motion

Composing and arranging
 Best Instrumental Composition
 Alan Silvestri (composer) for "Cast Away End Credits"
 Best Instrumental Arrangement
 Béla Fleck & Edgar Meyer (arrangers) for "Debussy: Doctor Gradus Ad Parnassum" performed by Béla Fleck with Joshua Bell & Gary Hoffmann
 Best Instrumental Arrangement Accompanying Vocalist(s)
 Paul Buckmaster (arranger) for "Drops of Jupiter" performed by Train

Country
 Best Female Country Vocal Performance
 Dolly Parton for "Shine"
 Best Male Country Vocal Performance
 Ralph Stanley for "O Death"
 Best Country Performance by a Duo or Group with Vocal
 Alison Krauss & Union Station for "The Lucky One"
 Best Country Collaboration with Vocals
 Harley Allen, Pat Enright & Dan Tyminski (The Soggy Bottom Boys) for "I am a Man of Constant Sorrow"
 Best Country Instrumental Performance
 Jerry Douglas, Gen Duncan, Vince Gill, Albert Lee, Steve Martin, Leon Russell, Earl Scruggs, Gary Scruggs, Randy Scruggs, Paul Shaffer & Marty Stuart for "Foggy Mountain Breakdown"
 Best Country Song
 Robert Lee Castleman (songwriter) for "The Lucky One" performed by Alison Krauss & Union Station
 Best Country Album
 Bonnie Garner, Luke Lewis & Mary Martin (producers) & various artists for Timeless: Hank Williams Tribute
 Best Bluegrass Album
 Gary Paczosa (engineer) & Alison Krauss & Union Station (producers and artists) for New Favorite

Film/TV/media
 Best Compilation Soundtrack Album for a Motion Picture, Television or Other Visual Media
 T Bone Burnett (producer), Peter Kurland & Mike Piersante (engineers) for O Brother, Where Art Thou? performed by various artists
 Best Song Written for a Motion Picture, Television or Other Visual Media
 John Flansburgh & John Linnell (songwriters) for "Boss of Me" (Malcolm in the Middle) performed by They Might Be Giants
 Best Score Soundtrack Album for a Motion Picture, Television or Other Visual Media
 Steven Epstein (producer), Richard King, Lu Xiao Xing & Xu Gou Qin (engineers) & Tan Dun (producer & composer) for Crouching Tiger, Hidden Dragon

Folk
 Best Traditional Folk Album
 T Bone Burnett (producer) & Mike Piersante (engineer) for Down from the Mountain performed by various artists
 Best Contemporary Folk Album
 Chris Shaw (engineer) & Bob Dylan (producer & artist) for Love and Theft
 Best Native American Music Album
 Giuli Doyle, Robert Doyle (producers) Jack Miller (engineer), Johnny Mike & Verdell Primeaux for Bless the People: Harmonized Peyote Songs

Gospel
 Best Pop/Contemporary Gospel Album
 Brown Bannister (producer), Steve Bishir, Reid Shippen (engineers) &  for CeCe Winans
 Best Rock Gospel Album
 Toby McKeehan (producer), Michael-Anthony "Mooki" Taylor (producer), Pete Stewart (producer), Adrian Belew (producer), David Bach (executive producer), Marcelo Pennell (engineer), Joe Baldridge (engineer) for DC Talk for Solo
 Best Traditional Soul Gospel Album
 John Chelew (producer), Larry Hirsch,  Jimmy Hoyson (engineers) & the Blind Boys of Alabama for Spirit of the Century
 Best Contemporary Soul Gospel Album
 Benjamin J. Arrindell, Biff Dawes,  Derek Lewis (engineers) & Yolanda Adams for The Experience
 Best Southern, Country or Bluegrass Gospel Album
 Chad Evans (engineer) & Bill Gaither (producer) for Bill & Gloria Gaither Present a Billy Graham Music Homecoming performed by Bill & Gloria Gaither & the Homecoming Friends
 Best Gospel Choir or Chorus Album
 Greg Hartman, John Jaszcz (engineers), Hezekiah Walker (choir director)  & the LFT Church Choir for Love Is Live!

Historical
 Best Historical Album
 Michael Brooks, Michael Cuscuna (producers), Matt Cavaluzzo, Harry Coster, Seth Foster, Darcy Proper, Ken Robertson & Mark Wilder (engineers) for Lady Day: The Complete Billie Holiday on Columbia 1933-1944

Jazz
 Best Jazz Instrumental Solo
 Michael Brecker for "Chan's Song" in Nearness of You: The Ballad Book
 Best Jazz Instrumental Album, Individual or Group
 Troy Halderson (engineer), Lucille Rollins (producer) & Sonny Rollins (producer & artist) for This Is What I Do
 Best Large Jazz Ensemble Album
 Tom Jung (engineer & producer), Bob Mintzer (producer) & the Bob Mintzer Big Band for Homage to Count Basie
 Best Jazz Vocal Album
 Erik Zobler (engineer), George M. Duke (producer) & Dianne Reeves for The Calling: Celebrating Sarah Vaughan
 Best Contemporary Jazz Album
 Khaliq-O-Vision, Ray Bardani (engineers), David Isaac (producer) & Marcus Miller (producer & artist) for  M²
 Best Latin Jazz Album
 Jay Newland (engineer), Gonzalo Rubalcaba (producer) & Charlie Haden (producer & artist) for Nocturne

Latin
 Best Latin Pop Album
 Joe Reyes, Michael Morales, Ronald Morales (engineers & producers) &  Freddy Fender for La Música de Baldemar Huerta
 Best Traditional Tropical Latin Album
 Javier Garza, John D. Thomas, Mike Couzzi, Ron Taylor, Scott Canto (engineers), Andrés Castro, Emilio Estefan, Jr., Sebastián Krys (producers) & Carlos Vives (producer & artist) for Déjame entrar
 Best Mexican/Mexican-American Album
 Edward Perez, Freddie Martinez, Jr., Greg García (engineers), Freddie Martinez Sr., Ramón Ayala (producers) & Ramón Ayala y sus Bravos del Norte for En Vivo... El Hombre y su Música
 Best Latin Rock/Alternative Album
 Ozomatli for Embrace the Chaos
 Best Tejano Album
 Edward Perez, Ramiro Serna (engineers), Rolando Benavidez, Amado Garza, Jr, Medardo Garza, Ben De León, Otoniel Peña Jr. (producers) & Solido for Nadie Como Tu
 Best Salsa Album
 Gustavo Celis, Ricky Blanco (engineers) & Roberto Blades (producer & artist) for La Negra Tiene Tumbao
 Best Merengue Album
 Eric Schilling (engineer) & Olga Tañon (producer & artist) for Yo Por Tí

Musical show
 Best Musical Show Album
 Cynthia Daniels (engineer), Hugh Fordin (producer), Mel Brooks (composer/lyricist) & the original Broadway cast with Nathan Lane & Matthew Broderick for The Producers

Music video
Best Short Form Music Video
 "Weapon Of Choice" – Fatboy Slim featuring Bootsy Collins
 Spike Jonze video director; Vincent Landay & Deannie O'Neil, video producers
 "Fly Away From Here" – Aerosmith
 Joseph Kahn, video director; Greg Tharp, video producer
 "One Minute Man" – Missy "Misdemeanor" Elliott featuring Ludacris
 David Meyers, video director; Ron Mohrhoff, video producer
 "Don't Tell Me" – Madonna
 Jean-Baptiste Mondino, video director; Maria Gallagher, video producer
 "Ms. Jackson" – Outkast
 F. Gary Gray, video director; Meredyth Frattolillo, video producer

Best Long Form Music Video
 Recording The Producers - A Musical Romp With Mel Brooks – Mel Brooks Susan Froemke, video director; Susan Froemke & Peter Gelb, video producers Rebel Music - The Bob Marley Story – Bob Marley
 Jeremy Marr, video director; Jeremy Marr, video producer
 Freddie Mercury - The Untold Story – Freddie Mercury
 Rudi Dolezal & Hannes Rossacher, video directors; Jim Beach & Rudi Dolezal, video producers
 Play: The DVD – Moby
 Moby, video director; Moby & Jeff Rogers, video producers

New Age
Best New Age Album
 A Day Without Rain - Enya Live From Montana - Philip Aaberg
 Cello Blue - David Darling
 Ancient - Kitarō
 Sacred Spirit II: More Chants and Dances of the Native Americans - Sacred Spirit

Packaging and notes
 Best Recording Package
 Stanley Donwood & Tchocky (art directors) for Amnesiac (Special Limited Edition) performed by Radiohead
 Best Boxed Recording Package
 Hugh Brown & Steve Vance (art director) for Brain in a Box - The Science Fiction Collection performed by various artists
 Best Album Notes
 Walter Mosley (notes writer) for Richard Pryor...And It's Deep Too! The Complete Warner Bros. Recordings (1968-1992)
 Elijah Wald (notes writer) for Arhoolie Records 40th Anniversary Collection: 1960-2000 the Journey of Chris Strachwitz performed by various artists

Polka
Best Polka Album
 Gone Polka - Jimmy SturrPop
Best Female Pop Vocal Performance
 "I'm Like a Bird" - Nelly Furtado "There You'll Be" - Faith Hill
 "Someone to Call My Lover" - Janet Jackson
 "By Your Side" - Sade
 "Essence" - Lucinda Williams

Best Male Pop Vocal Performance
 "Don't Let Me Be Lonely Tonight" - James Taylor "Fill Me In" - Craig David
 "You Rock My World" - Michael Jackson
 "I Want Love" - Elton John
 "Still" - Brian McKnight

Best Pop Performance by a Duo or Group with Vocal
 "Stuck in a Moment You Can't Get Out Of" - U2 "Shape of My Heart" - Backstreet Boys
 "Superman (It's Not Easy)" - Five for Fighting
 "Gone" - *NSYNC"
 "Imitation of Life" - R.E.M.

Best Pop Collaboration with Vocals
 "Lady Marmalade" - Christina Aguilera, Lil' Kim, Mýa, and P!nk
 "Nobody Wants To Be Lonely" - Christina Aguilera & Ricky Martin
 "New York State of Mind" - Tony Bennett & Billy Joel
 "My Kind of Girl" - Brian McKnight & Justin Timberlake
 "It Wasn't Me" - Shaggy & Ricardo "RikRok" Ducent

Best Pop Instrumental Performance
 "Reptile" - Eric Clapton
 "Room 335" - Larry Carlton & Steve Lukather
 "Short Circuit" - Daft Punk
 "Rain" - Eric Johnson & Alien Love Child
 "There You'll Be" - Kirk Whalum

Best Dance Recording
Steve Hodge (mixer), Jimmy Jam and Terry Lewis (producers), & Janet Jackson (producer & artist) for "All for You"

Best Pop Vocal Album
 Sade Adu - Lovers Rock
 Nelly Furtado - Whoa, Nelly! Elton John - Songs from the West Coast Janet Jackson - All for You NSYNC - CelebrityBest Pop Instrumental Album
 Yoshiyasu Kumada (engineer), Steve Vai (engineer & producer), Steve Lukather (producer & artist) & Larry Carlton for No Substitutions: Live in OsakaProduction and engineering
 Best Engineered Album, Non-Classical
 Al Schmitt (engineer) for The Look of Love performed by Diana Krall
 Best Engineered Album, Classical
 Richard King (engineer) & Joshua Bell for Bernstein (Arr. Brohn & Corigliano): West Side Story Suite (Lonely Town; Make Our Garden Grow, Etc.) Best Remixed Recording, Non-Classical
 Deep Dish (remixer) for "Thank You (Deep Dish Vocal Remix)" performed by Dido
 Producer of the Year, Non-Classical
 T Bone Burnett
 Producer of the Year, Classical
 Manfred Eicher

R&B
Best Female R&B Vocal Performance
 "Fallin'" – Alicia Keys
 "Rock the Boat" – Aaliyah
 "Video" – India.Arie
 "Family Affair" – Mary J. Blige
 "Hit 'em Up Style (Oops!)" – Blu Cantrell
 "A Long Walk" – Jill Scott

Best Male R&B Vocal Performance
 "U Remind Me" – Usher
 "Missing You" – Case
 "Lifetime" – Maxwell
 "Love of My Life" – Brian McKnight
 "Love" – Musiq Soulchild

Best R&B Performance by a Duo or Group with Vocal
 "Survivor" –  Destiny's Child
 "What Would You Do?" – City High
 "Can't Believe" – Faith Evans featuring Carl Thomas
 "Contagious" – The Isley Brothers
 "Peaches & Cream" – 112

Best R&B Song
 "Fallin'"
 Alicia Keys, songwriter (Alicia Keys)
 "Didn't Cha Know?"
 Erykah Badu, songwriter (Erykah Badu)
 "Get Ur Freak On"
 M. Elliott & T. Mosley, songwriters (Missy "Misdemeanor" Elliott)
 "Hit 'Em Up Style (Oops!)"
 Dallas Austin, songwriter (Blu Cantrell)
 "Love of My Life"
 Brian McKnight, songwriter (Brian McKnight)
 "Video"
 India.Arie, Carlos "Six July" Broady & Shannon Sanders, songwriters (India.Arie)

Best R&B Album
 Songs in A Minor – Alicia Keys Aaliyah – Aaliyah
 Acoustic Soul – India.Arie
 No More Drama – Mary J. Blige
 Survivor – Destiny's Child

Best Traditional R&B Vocal Album
 At Last – Gladys Knight This Is Regina – Regina Belle
 An American Original – Lamont Dozier
 Three Wishes – Miki Howard
 For the Love... – The O'Jays

Rap
Best Rap Solo Performance
 "Get Ur Freak On" – Missy "Misdemeanor" Elliott "Because I Got High" – Afroman
 "Who We Be" – DMX
 "Izzo (H.O.V.A.)" – Jay-Z
 "Ride wit Me" – Nelly
Best Rap Performance by a Duo or Group
 "Ms. Jackson" – OutKast "Clint Eastwood" – Gorillaz
 "Put It on Me" – Ja Rule featuring Lil' Mo & Vita
 "Change the Game" – Jay-Z featuring Beanie Sigel & Memphis Bleek
 "Bad Boy for Life" – P. Diddy, Black Rob & Mark Curry

Best Rap/Sung Collaboration
 "Let Me Blow Ya Mind" – Eve featuring Gwen Stefani "Livin' It Up" – Ja Rule featuring Case
 "Where the Party At" – Jagged Edge featuring Nelly
 "Area Codes" – Ludacris featuring Nate Dogg
 "W" – Mystic featuring Planet Asia

Best Rap Album
 Stankonia – OutKast Scorpion – Eve
 Pain Is Love – Ja Rule
 The Blueprint – Jay-Z
 Back for the First Time – Ludacris

Reggae
Best Reggae Album
 Arlick Thompson (engineer), Stephen Marley (producer) & Damian Marley for Halfway TreeRock
Best Female Rock Vocal Performance
 'Get Right With God" - Lucinda WilliamsBest Male Rock Vocal Performance
 "Dig In" - Lenny KravitzBest Rock Performance by a Duo or Group with Vocal
 "Elevation" - U2Best Rock Instrumental Performance
 "Dirty Mind" - Jeff BeckBest Hard Rock Performance
 "Crawling" - Linkin ParkBest Metal Performance
 "Schism" - Tool  
Best Rock Song
 Charlie Colin, Rob Hotchkiss, Pat Monahan, Jimmy Stafford & Scott Underwood (songwriters) for "Drops of Jupiter" performed by TrainBest Rock Album
 All That You Can't Leave Behind - U2Best Alternative Music Album
 Parachutes - ColdplaySpoken
 Best Spoken Word Album
 Jeffrey S. Thomas, Steven Strassman (engineers) & Elisa Shokoff (producer) & Quincy Jones for Q: The Autobiography of Quincy Jones
 Best Spoken Comedy Album
 John Runnette (producer) & George Carlin for Napalm & Sillyputty

Traditional Pop
Best Traditional Pop Vocal Album
 Songs I Heard - Harry Connick Jr.World
 Best World Music Album
 Tom Lazarus (engineer), Hans Wendl (producer) & Ravi Shankar for  Full Circle: Carnegie Hall 2000

Special merit awards
Lifetime Achievement Award
 Rosemary Clooney
 Count Basie
 Perry Como
 Al Green
 Joni Mitchell

Trustees Award
 Arif Mardin
 Phil Ramone

Tech Award
 Les Paul
 Digidesign

MusiCares Person of the Year
 Billy JoelRecording Academy's Governors Award
 Janet JacksonTrivia
 Lenny Kravitz won his fourth consecutive Grammy award in the Best Male Rock Vocal Performance category for "Dig In", breaking the record for most wins in that category (1999-2002).
 The 44th Annual Grammy Awards was the first Grammy show following the September 11 attacks of 2001. As a result, several memorable performances included:
 U2's opening performance of "Walk On", which won Record of the Year later on that night
 Mary J. Blige's performance of "No More Drama"
 Alan Jackson's performance of "Where Were You (When the World Stopped Turning)"

Host Jon Stewart also did a skit mocking the new airport security measures put into place following September 11.

Notes
A ^'''Award recipients also include Alison Krauss & Union Station, Chris Sharp, Chris Thomas King, Emmylou Harris, Gillian Welch, Harley Allen, John Hartford, Mike Compton, Norman Blake, Pat Enright, Peasall Sisters, Ralph Stanley, Sam Bush, Stuart Duncan, The Cox Family, The Fairfield Four, The Whites & Tim Blake Nelson as the artists.

References

 044
2002 in American music
2002 in California
2002 music awards
2002 in Los Angeles
February 2002 events in the United States
Grammy